Ann Elizabeth Paludan (née Murray; 1928–2014) was a British author of several books on Chinese history, sculpture and architecture.

Biography

Ann Paludan was one of two daughters of Pauline Mary ( Newton) and Basil Murray. Her father was the second son of the eminent classical scholar Gilbert Murray and his wife, Mary ( Howard), and Ann would visit her grandparents at Yatscombe, on Boars Hill, particularly during her undergraduate years in St Hugh's College, Oxford when she cycled up to Yatscombe every Sunday. 

Her parents had split up when she was young and her father died in Spain when she was eight, so her visits to her grandparents gave a welcome sense of continuity.  On her mother's side she was the granddaughter of the painter Algernon Newton RA, of the family which founded the Winsor and Newton paints company, and a niece of actor Robert Newton. After graduating she worked as a British diplomat, marrying John Ernest Powell-Jones in December 1949 and starting a life abroad in 1949. 

Her son, Sir Mark Jones, was born on 5 February 1951; he was an art historian and museum director and has been Master of St Cross College, Oxford since 2011.

Janus Paludan (1920–2004), a Danish diplomat, had served as Danish Ambassador to the Congo 1962–1965 and to Brazil 1968–1972, and he and Ann married before he took up the post of Danish Ambassador to China in 1972. They lived in Beijing until 1976, and thereafter she returned regularly to China on research trips. He then served as Ambassador to Egypt in 1976 and to Iceland from 1977 to 1984, after which they retired to northern Cumbria. 
Janus Paludan died in 2004.

Ann Paludan died in 2014, aged 86. She was survived by her son Mark, a daughter (Elizabeth), five grandchildren and three great-grandchildren. Her son Robert died in 1998.

Books
Ann Paludan researched the history of China and wrote a number of authoritative and widely cited books:

References

English writers
Historians of China
1928 births
2014 deaths
Alumni of St Hugh's College, Oxford
English women writers